Jayashri Naishadh Raiji (1895–1985) was an Indian independence activist, social worker, reformist and politician. She was a member of the 1st Lok Sabha from Bombay Suburban seat.

Early life
Jayashri was born on 26 October 1895 to Sir Manubhai Mehta in Surat and for her higher studies attended the Baroda College.

Career
Known for her social work, Raiji became the chairperson of Bombay Presidency Women's Council in 1919. During the Non-cooperation movement (1930), she participated in the picketing of shops selling foreign goods and was imprisoned by British authorities for six months during the Quit India Movement (1942).To encourage the adoption of swadeshi goods, she helped organise exhibitions and set up women's co-operative stores.

After India gained independence, she contest the first general elections from Bombay Suburban constituency and became a member of the 1st Lok Sabha. She was one of founding members of the Indian Council for Child Welfare. In 1980, she was awarded the Jamnalal Bajaj Award for Development and Welfare of Women And Children.

Personal life
She was married to N. M. Raiji in 1918 and had four children from him. She died in 1985.

References

1895 births
People from Vadodara
Indian National Congress politicians from Maharashtra
India MPs 1952–1957
Lok Sabha members from Maharashtra
Women members of the Lok Sabha
Indian social reformers
Indian independence activists from Maharashtra
Social workers
Prisoners and detainees of British India
Indian feminists
1985 deaths
Indian humanitarians
20th-century Indian women politicians
20th-century Indian politicians
Women in Maharashtra politics
20th-century Indian educational theorists
Social workers from Maharashtra
Women educators from Maharashtra
Educators from Maharashtra
20th-century women educators